Cambridge Historic District may refer to:

in the United States (by state then alphabetically):
Cambridge Historic District, Wards I and III, Cambridge, Maryland, listed on the National Register of Historic Places (NRHP) in Maryland
East Cambridge Historic District, Cambridge, Massachusetts, listed on the NRHP in Massachusetts
Old Cambridge Historic District, Cambridge, Massachusetts, listed on the NRHP in Massachusetts
Cambridge Historic District (Cambridge, New York), listed on the NRHP in New York